Ebun Oluwa Pro Veritas College (EPROV) is a merger name of a private primary and secondary school in Ikeja, Lagos. The two schools that form Ebun Oluwa Pro Veritas College are Ebun Oluwa Nursery/Primary School and Veritas College Secondary school, both founded by Mrs Jokotade Awosika.

Ebun Oluwa Nursery/Primary School

History
Established on October 10, 1994, Ebun Oluwa Nursery/Primary was founded by Mrs. Jokotade Awosika with an initial intake of about 20 pioneer students. The pioneer academic staff was composed of some experienced teachers ably supported by a couple of graduate teachers

Curriculum
 English Language, Grammar, Verbal Aptitude
 Mathematics, Quantitative Aptitude
 Cultural and Creative Arts
 Nigerian Language
 French
 Music
 Elementary Science 
 Social Studies
 Physical and Health Education

Veritas College Secondary School
Veritas College along with Ebun Oluwa Nursery/Primary was founded by Mrs. Jokotade Awosika. It is a coed school and it has been used for scenes for some Nigerian films. Veritas College was awarded the first runner-up in Hi Impact 4 Creative Kids 2013 event.

Uniform
The boys' school uniform consists of cream-colored shirt (long-sleeved for those in the senior school and short-sleeved for those in the junior school), a school tie and a school badge, green and cream checked trousers, and a green blazer for those in the senior school. The girls' school uniform consists of cream-colored gown with a green and cream plaids, a school badge, and a green blazer for those in the senior school

Principals
 Mrs. Bisi
 Mrs. Grace Dibia
 Mrs. Folashade Atanda, 2004–2012
 Mr. Fatoki Sunday Oladepo, 2012–present

Alumni

See also 
 List of schools in Nigeria

References

Secondary schools in Lagos State